Homerton is a station on the North London line in the district of Homerton, East London. The station and all trains serving it are operated by London Overground. It is in London fare zone 2. The current station opened on 13 May 1985 to coincide with the introduction of the Richmond to North Woolwich through electric passenger service. The station is close to Homerton University Hospital and Hackney Marshes.

History
The original station was opened on 1 October 1868 by the North London Railway. Services ceased on 15 May 1944 with a substitute bus service provided until official closure on 23 April 1945. Other than a partial section of wall to the north of the bridge over Barnabas Road, the original 1868 station has been demolished. Although of reduced size, the original station building would have been similar to buildings remaining at Hackney Central and Camden Road. 

The present basic station was opened on 13 May 1985, to coincide with the introduction of the North London Link service between Richmond and North Woolwich.

Engineering work continued until May 2011, during which reduced services operated and Sunday services were suspended. The line reopened on 1 June 2010.

Services

References

External links

 Excel file displaying National Rail station usage information for 2005/06

Proposed Chelsea-Hackney Line stations
Railway stations in the London Borough of Hackney
Former North London Railway stations
Railway stations in Great Britain opened in 1868
Railway stations in Great Britain closed in 1944
Reopened railway stations in Great Britain
Railway stations in Great Britain opened in 1985
Railway stations served by London Overground
Homerton